Nusfjord is a fishing village in Flakstad Municipality in Lofoten in Nordland county, Norway.  The village lies on the southern shore of the island of Flakstadøya, along the Vestfjorden. 

In 2017, Uwe Rosenberg designed and published a board game about fishing that was named after the village.

References

External links
Nusfjord.no 

Fishing communities
Flakstad
Lofoten